Stories of Darkness and Dread is a collection of stories by American writer  Joseph Payne Brennan.  It was released in 1973 and was the author's second collection of stories published by Arkham House.  It was published in an edition of 4,138 copies.  (The colophon in the book states 4,000; however, the more accurate figure is taken from reference sources). Most of the stories had originally appeared in Alfred Hitchcock's Mystery Magazine, Macabre, Magazine of Horror and other magazines, although several of the tales had appeared in Brennan's earlier collection Scream at Midnight (1963).

Contents

Stories of Darkness and Dread contains the following tales:

 "City of the Seven Winds"
 "The Keeper of the Dust"
 "Zombique"
 "The Seventh Incantation"
 "Delivery on Erdmore Street"
 "The Way to the Attic"
 "Mr. Octbur"
 "Episode on Cain Street"
 "Killer Cat"
 "In the Very Stones"
 "The House at 1248"
 "Black Thing at Midnight"
 "Monton"
 "Apprehension"
 "The House on Hazel Street"
 "The Man in Grey Tweeds"
 "The North Knoll"
 "The Dump"

Sources

1973 short story collections
Fantasy short story collections
Horror short story collections
Arkham House books